Rebecca Scroggs  is an English actress from London. She trained at the Royal Academy of Dramatic Art (2006-2009) and has performed numerous roles in theatre and television.

Early life 
Rebecca was born in London. Her mother is English mother and her father from Angola. She obtained a degree in European Drama and French at the University of Sussex (2001-2005), As part of her degree she spent a year at the Universite de Provence, Aix-en-Provence. Following her graduation from Sussex she was accepted to train at the Royal Academy of Dramatic Art (RADA) in London, where she graduated with a Bachelor of Arts in Acting.

Career
Scroggs began her career at London's Tricycle Theatre appearing in Detaining Justice by Bola Agbaje, directed by Indhu Rubasingham. She appeared at the Royal National Theatre in George Buchner's Danton's Death directed by Michael Grandage in 2010 and again in 2016, as Maya in The Suicide, adapted from the Russian play by Maxim Gorky by Suhayla El-Bushra and directed by Nadia Fall. In 2017 she starred in the premier of Chris Bush's Steel at the Crucible Theatre, directed by Rebecca Frecknall, doubling the roles of Vanessa Gallacher and Josie Kirkwood. In 2022 Rebecca played Mrs Muller in a production of Doubt:A Parable at Chichester Festival Theatre directed by Lia Williams.

On television she has appeared in many series including Flack (Sky), Alex Rider (Amazon), Before We Die (Channel 4), Scarborough (BBC), Death in Paradise (BBC), Grace (ITV). 

She is a regular in upcoming Apple TV series Constellations.

Filmography

Film

Television

Video games

References

External links 
 
 Vimeo Showreel
 Vocalpoint

Black British actresses
Living people
People from London
21st-century English actresses
Actresses from London
Alumni of the University of Sussex
Alumni of RADA
English stage actresses
English television actresses
English voice actresses
1982 births